Singari is a 1951 Indian Tamil language comedy film directed by T. R. Raghunath. The film stars T. R. Ramachandran, Lalitha and Padmini. It was released on 29 October 1951.

Plot 

A young man (Nayagam) who is wrongly convicted for a bank robbery leaves his young daughter behind to serve a seven-year sentence in prison. She is involved in a car accident. The car owner, a rich man, (Balasubramaniam) brings her up as his own, changing her name (Padmini). A college-going girl (Lalitha) drawn to the world of entertainment runs away from home and joins a drama troupe run by TRR assisted by a crooked manager (T. K. Ramachandran). Sahasranamam (the rich man's son) is thrown out of the house by his father because of his insistence on going abroad for further studies. The father goes on a long pilgrimage and Sahasranamam coming back meets Padmini who is drawn to him. However, he goes around with the stage actor (Lalitha), creating much gossip. Indeed T. R. Ramachandran is in love with her. Complications ensue and, in the end, it turns out that the young women are the daughters of two brothers and the two couples marry and live happily.

Cast 
Adapted from the opening credits of the film

Male cast
T. R. Ramachandran
S. V. Sahasranamam
D. Balasubramaniam
T. K. Ramachandran
V. K. Ramasamy
C. V. Nayagam
C. S. Pandian
T. V. Radhakrishnan
Thangavelu

Female cast
Lalitha
Padmini
Ragini
N. R. Leela
Nirmala
M. M. Radha Bai
C. K. Saraswathi
M. S. S. Bhagyam

Soundtrack 
Music was composed by 3 music directors – T. A. Kalyanam, S. V. Venkatraman and T. R. Ramanathan while the lyrics were penned by Thanjai N. Ramaiah Dass, K. P. Kamatchi Sundaram and Kannadasan. Probably T. R. Ramanathan handled the background music as his name does not appear in the credits for songs.

Songs 
The following list of songs is adapted from the book authored by K. Neelamegam.

Reception 
Film historian Randor Guy wrote in 2011 that the film was remembered for its storyline, music, song, dances and the remarkable performance of artistes like Sahasranamam, Lalitha, Padmini, D. Balasubramaniam and Kaka Radhakrishnan.

Legacy 
Comedian K. A. Thangavelu came to be known as Danaal Thangavelu because he used the phrase Danaal Danaal in his dialogues in this film.

References

External links 
 

1950s Tamil-language films
1951 comedy films
1951 films
Films directed by T. R. Raghunath
Films scored by S. V. Venkatraman
Indian comedy films
Films scored by T. A. Kalyanam
Films scored by T. R. Ramanathan